"God Bless the Child" is a song written by Billie Holiday and Arthur Herzog Jr. in 1939. It was first recorded on May 9, 1941, by Billie Holiday and released by the Okeh Records in 1942.

Holiday's version of the song was honored with the Grammy Hall of Fame Award in 1976. It was also included in the list of Songs of the Century, by the Recording Industry Association of America and the National Endowment for the Arts.

Billie Holiday recording sessions
Billie Holiday recorded the song three times.

First recording (Session #44, Columbia/Okeh): Columbia Studio A, 799 Seventh Avenue, New York City, May 9, 1941, Eddie Heywood and his Orchestra with Roy Eldridge (trumpet), Jimmy Powell and Lester Boone (alto saxophone), Ernie Powell (trumpet), Eddie Heywood (piano), Johan Robins (guitar), Paul Chapman (guitar), Grachan Moncur II (bass), Herbert Cowans (drums), Billie Holiday (vocal).

Second recording (Session #65, her final Decca session): Los Angeles March 8, 1950, Gordon Jenkins and his Orchestra (CD: Complete Decca vol.2, tk 23 & 24)
Dick ‘Dent’ Eckles (fl)(ts) Charles LaVere (p) ‘Bob’ Bain (g) Lou Butterman (b) Nick Fatool (d) Billie Holiday (v) The Gordon Jenkins Singer chorus + 4 Strings

Third and final recording (Session #76, Verve): New York City, June 7, 1956, Billie Holiday with Tony Scott & his Orchestra (CD The Complete BH on Verve, viol. 7 tk 5-8)
Charlie Shavers (tp) Tony Scott (cl) Paul Quinichette (ts) Wynton Kelly (p) Kennie Burrell (g) Aaron Bell (b) Lennie Mc Browne (d) Billie Holiday (v)

Origin and interpretation 
In her autobiography Lady Sings the Blues Holiday indicated that an argument with her mother over money led to the song. She stated that during the argument she said "God bless the child that's got his own." The anger over the incident led her to use that line as the starting point for a song, which she worked out in conjunction with Herzog.

In his 1990 book Jazz Singing, Will Friedwald describes the song as "sacred and profane," as it references the Bible while indicating that religion seems to have no effect in making people treat each other better.

References

1939 songs
1941 singles
Billie Holiday songs
Grammy Hall of Fame Award recipients
Songs written by Arthur Herzog Jr.
Songs written by Billie Holiday
Grammy Award for Best Traditional R&B Vocal Performance